The Drekalovići are a historical union of brotherhoods of Kuči with an Albanian origin.
Their patron saint (slava) is St. Nicholas (Nikoljdan).
They were part of a wave of settlement in the mid 16th century in the area of Kuči, and came to form an important part of it.  Unlike the brotherhoods that form Old Kuči (the families that already lived in the area before their arrival) the Drekalovići all claim ancestry from a single ancestor, Drekale after whom they are named.

Originally, a Catholic and Albanian-speaking tribe, they gradually became Orthodox and Slavic-speaking, in particular after the conversion of their leader Lale Drekalov in the 17th century when Rufim Njeguš was Metropolitan of Cetinje. The Drekalovići marry within Kuči, but historically form no marriage with Berisha or a large part of Kastrati, fis which they regarded in their tradition as patrilineally related to them.

Notable people 
Drekale
Lale Drekalov
Iliko Lalev
Radonja Petrović
Marko Miljanov Popović

References

Kuči